Bi1 is a hypermarket chain in Poland and supermarket chain in France.

Poland 
In Poland bi1 was created due to acquisition of Real by Auchan.

References

External links 

 Official Polish site

Supermarkets of Poland
Companies of Poland